First Capital Bank may refer to one of the following:

 First Capital Bank Botswana Limited
 First Capital Bank Malawi Limited
 First Capital Bank Mozambique
 First Capital Bank Zambia Limited
 First Capital Bank Zimbabwe Limited
 First Capital Bank Group